Arachnobas is a genus of true weevil family.

Species 
 Arachnobas alboguttatus
 Arachnobas biguttatus
 Arachnobas gazella
 Arachnobas jekeli
 Arachnobas sectator
 Arachnobas striga

References 

  Weevil
 Encyclopedia of Life
 Wtaxa
 Ubio
 Global species

Molytinae